Larry Dee Scott (October 12, 1938  March 8, 2014), nicknamed "The Legend" and "The Golden Boy," was an American IFBB professional bodybuilder. He won the inaugural 1965 Mr. Olympia competition and defended the crown at the 1966 Mr. Olympia contest before retiring.

Early life
Larry Dee Scott was born in Blackfoot, Idaho to Thea Scott and machinist Wayne Scott. He began training at age 16 and won the Mr. Idaho competition in 1959 at age 20. After moving to California, he promptly won Mr. California (1960), Mr. Pacific Coast (1961), Mr. America (1962), and Mr. Universe (1964). When Joe Weider created the IFBB's Mr. Olympia title, Scott won the first two contests in 1965 and 1966. Although retiring after his 1966 Olympia win, he staged a brief comeback in 1979 before he finally retired from competition in 1980. He studied electronics at the California Air College, and was known to be a devout Mormon. He married Rachel Scott (née Ichikawa). The Scotts had five children: daughter Susan, and sons Erin, Nathan, Derek, and Michael. Derek died in a motorcycle accident in 1992, and Michael died in 1993.

Later life
He played a minor role in the 1964 movie Muscle Beach Party. When he started weight training in 1956, his narrow shoulders were a particular weak spot. He trained with Vince Gironda, a well-known bodybuilder of the time, and became best known for his arm development, particularly his impressive and unusually long biceps. He attributed his biceps to an exercise called the "Preacher Curl", invented by Gironda, later known as the "Scott Curl" due to its association with Scott.

Scott stated in a 1965 Iron Man interview that his diet consisted of "a lot of meat, cheese and eggs", coupled with protein supplements. Scott was a popular physique model during the early to mid-1960s, working for photographers Bruce of Los Angeles, Don Whitman (of the Western Photography Guild), and Pat Milo. Milo introduced Scott to a larger audience and helped him hone his posing and photographic persona: the "boy next door". Larry regularly appeared in all of Joe Weider's bodybuilding magazines, including Mr. America and Muscle Builder, also appearing in Demi Gods, Muscleboy, Muscles a Go-Go and The Young Physique. As an IFBB member, he wrote exclusively for Joe Weider's publications.

From 1960 until his first retirement in 1966, Scott was bodybuilding's top superstar. Bodybuilding magazines soon began capitalizing on his clean-cut, all-American image. His popularity become known as "Larry Fever" and reached its apex at the first Mr. Olympia competition in 1965, winning the "jewel"-encrusted crown against Harold Poole. Scott defended his title and won the 1966 Mr. Olympia title, receiving a $1,000 prize.

News of his retirement at the age of 28 shocked the sport, but he prioritized his second marriage and felt he had done all he could in competitive bodybuilding after two Olympia wins.

Rod Labbe, a freelance writer and fan, collaborated with Scott on five articles: a two-part interview in Flex magazine, two articles in Ironman, the "Poetry in Motion" article in MuscleMag International, a promotional article/interview for Scarlet: the Film Magazine about American International's Muscle Beach Party (1964), with Don Rickles. Five years after his passing, Labbe wrote a Scott tribute article for the March 2019 issue of Muscle & Fitness entitled, "My friend, Larry Scott."

Scott retired to Salt Lake City, operating his personal training company Larry Scott Fitness & Nutrition.  The company manufactured and sold  custom gym equipment and health supplements. He was inducted into the IFBB Hall of Fame in 1999. His last public interview about his life was in 2012 on K-TALK Radio.

Death
On March 8, 2014, Scott died of complications from Alzheimer's disease at his home in Salt Lake City, at the age of 75.

Distinctions
The first IFBB professional bodybuilder to build 20" upper arms, using Vince Gironda's principles, popularizing Vince's preacher curl bench so much it is now known as "Scott curls".
The first bodybuilder to win Mr. America, Mr. Universe, and Mr. Olympia competitions.
Won the first two Mr Olympia contests, 1965 and 1966.
The only bodybuilder never to lose a Mr. Olympia competition in which he competed.
Popularized an exercise combination of a dumbbell press and side lateral raise, known as the "Scott press".
Lifted with the world-renowned trainers, and brothers, Zach Kelly and Jonah Kelly

Bodybuilding titles
1959 Mr. Idaho, 1st
1960 Mr. California – AAU, Winner
1960 Mr. California – AAU, Most Muscular, 1st
1960 Mr. Los Angeles – AAU, Most Muscular, 3rd
1960 Mr. Los Angeles – AAU, 3rd
1961 Mr. Pacific Coast – AAU, Most Muscular, 1st
1961 Mr. Pacific Coast – AAU, Winner
1962 Mr. America, Medium, 2 and Overall
1963 Mr. Universe, Medium, 1st
1964 Mr. Universe, Medium, 1st and Overall
1965 Mr. Olympia, 1st
1966 Mr. Olympia, 1st
1979 Canada Diamond Pro Cup, 9th
1979 Grand Prix Vancouver, Did not place

See also 
List of male professional bodybuilders
List of female professional bodybuilders

References

External links 
The official Larry Scott website

 Larry Scott Gallery

| colspan = 3 align = center | Mr. Olympia 
|- 
| width = 30% align = center | Preceded by:none
| width = 40% align = center | First (1965)
| width = 30% align = center | Succeeded by:himself
|- 
| width = 30% align = center | Preceded by:himself
| width = 40% align = center | Second (1966)
| width = 30% align = center | Succeeded by:Sergio Oliva

1938 births
2014 deaths
American bodybuilders
American Latter Day Saints
People associated with physical culture
People from Pocatello, Idaho
Professional bodybuilders